John Morton,  D.D. was  an English Anglican priest in the 18th century.

Morton was  educated at Lincoln College, Oxford. He held livings at Washington and Stanhope. Lever was Archdeacon of Northumberland from 5 October 1685 until his death on 10 November 1722.

Notes

18th-century English Anglican priests
Archdeacons of Northumberland
Alumni of Lincoln College, Oxford
1722 deaths